"Rainbow" is the fifth episode of the second season of the American sports comedy-drama television series Ted Lasso, based on the character played by Jason Sudeikis in a series of promos for NBC Sports' coverage of England's Premier League. It is the 15th overall episode of the series and was written by executive producer Bill Wrubel and directed by Erica Dunton. It was released on Apple TV+ on August 20, 2021.

The series follows Ted Lasso, an American college football coach, who is unexpectedly recruited to coach a fictional English Premier League soccer team, AFC Richmond, despite having no experience coaching soccer. The team's owner, Rebecca Welton, hires Lasso hoping he will fail as a means of exacting revenge on the team's previous owner, Rupert, her unfaithful ex-husband. The previous season saw Rebecca change her mind on the club's direction and working Ted in saving it, although the club is relegated from the Premier League. In the episode, Isaac's role as leader of the club is questioned, prompting Ted to ask Roy for help. Meanwhile, Nate asks Keeley and Rebecca for help in getting a specific reservation for a restaurant.

The episode received positive reviews, with critics praising the episode's ending and performances. However, some criticized the episode's failure in properly exploring previous storylines. For his performance in the episode, Brett Goldstein won Outstanding Supporting Actor in a Comedy Series at the 74th Primetime Emmy Awards.

Plot
Nate (Nick Mohammed) arrives at a restaurant to reserve a window seat for his parents' anniversary, but the hostess declines his petition and instead offers a seat in the back, which underwhelms him. He tries to use his connection to Roy (Brett Goldstein) to get it, but fails. 

AFC Richmond loses another game, with the club blaming Isaac (Kola Bokinni) for his poor leadership. This prompts Ted (Jason Sudeikis) to ask Roy for help. Roy takes Ted and Isaac to a soccer field near his childhood home. He reminds Isaac that he must have fun while playing, so he plays with the crowd to motivate himself. Meanwhile, Keeley (Juno Temple) now owns an app named Bantr, which matches people on dates and acts as the club's new sponsor, with Rebecca (Hannah Waddingham) deciding to use it. They also help with Nate's request for the restaurant, stating that he needs to be more confident about himself if he wants the seat.

That night, Nate is once again sent to the seat in the back. After talking with himself on the restroom mirror, he confidently tells the hostess that he wants the window seat, which is granted. Back at the soccer field, Isaac's skills have improved. Ted offers Roy a chance to return to Richmond as a coach, but Roy feels the soccer days are behind him. The next day, AFC Richmond prepares for another game, with Isaac now believing in himself and his team. While talking on Soccer Saturday, Roy laments how judgmental the commentators are, instead of fully giving advice. He quits his position and arrives at the stadium, where the crowd cheers for him. Roy accepts Ted's coach offer, although Nate is clearly unhappy with the decision.

Development

Production
The episode was directed by Erica Dunton and written by executive producer Bill Wrubel. This was Dunton's first directing credit, and Wrubel's first writing credit for the show.

Writing
According to Brett Goldstein, the writers always intended Roy to coach at AFC Richmond for the season. He also added, "More the discussion was how long we could hold it off, how long could we keep Roy away from Richmond without it being an issue."

Critical reviews

"Rainbow" received positive reviews from critics. Myles McNutt of The A.V. Club gave the episode a "B-" and wrote, "I remain charmed by Ted Lassos micro-level whimsy, whether it's the Sheffield Wednesday repartee or the notion that Roy Kent once dated Gina Gershon, but what 'Rainbow' reinforced is that extending to macro-level whimsy as this RomCom theme did doesn't work as well. Between the lack of fallout from Sam's protest, the missed connections on Nate's behavior, and the cutesiness of the whole affair, it's an episode that I liked better the second time I watched it when I wasn't focused as much on all that and could simply take in the show's base-level pleasures. In other words, it's an example of how writing about this show in this format may in some ways be antithetical to its way of being, even if I do feel like that tension reveals some missed opportunities worth digging into." 

Alan Sepinwall of Rolling Stone wrote, "'Rainbow' fumbles a few of this season's ongoing subplots, but it also gets the most important part exactly right. And when you want to spend the rest of your life with a show that makes you happy, you want the rest of your life to start as soon as possible, right?" 

Keith Phipps of Vulture gave the episode a perfect 5 star rating out of 5 and wrote, "Is this the second season's best episode? Is it Ted Lassos best episode? It has to be up there. Just about everyone gets a great moment or a great line (even the otherwise sidelined Jamie makes a fun contribution to the rom-com discussion), it pushes the season-long story in some intriguing new directions, and the final stretch, set to the Higginses favorite song, is spectacular. What more could you ask for?" Becca Newton of TV Fanatic gave the episode a perfect 5 star rating out of 5 and wrote, "Wow! Since Ted Lasso began airing, there have been episodes rated the most passionate, the most pure. 'Rainbow' blew them all away." 

Linda Holmes of NPR wrote, "People have tried a lot of ways to describe how Ted Lasso feels: it's like a warm hug, it's like a comfortable blanket, it's a pandemic balm, it's a feel-good chocolate cake in your belly, whatever. But what makes it that way is rarely discussed with specificity: The show is the way it is because it's almost exclusively a nested and interlocked set of well-built love stories." Christopher Orr of The New York Times wrote, "Last week, we had a hyper-meta episode framed around Love Actually. This week, we have a hyper-meta episode framed around romantic comedies more broadly."

Awards and accolades
TVLine named Nick Mohammed as an honorable mention as the "Performer of the Week" for the week of August 21, 2021, for his performance in the episode. The site wrote, "As Ted Lassos cowering kit man-turned-assistant coach Nathan Shelley, Nick Mohammed has spent the last season and a half talking under his breath. But during Friday's episode, the actor got to play the character at both his most timid and his most brazen — and he excelled on both fronts."

Brett Goldstein submitted this episode for consideration for his Primetime Emmy Award for Outstanding Supporting Actor in a Comedy Series nomination at the 74th Primetime Emmy Awards. He would win the award, his second Emmy win.

References

External links
 

Ted Lasso episodes
2021 American television episodes